is a kind of traditional Japanese street performance. The name "Nankin tamasudare" is a play on words, as it can mean a kind of flower, as well as mean something like "a wondrous woven screen" (sudare is a kind of screen made by weaving straw with twine.)

The performance consists of a person skilled in manipulating special screens made of loosely woven sticks, as well as chanting an accompanying kind of poetry. The performer chants a rhythmic poem as he or she uses the screen to portray the objects in the poetry without stopping. The screen is twisted, folded, extended, etc., in many different ways to portray an object, and then brought back quickly to its original screen shape. The chant usually ends with a pun: kaeru nai has the double meaning that there is no  under the willow tree, and the willow tree figure cannot  easily to the original shape. The story ends with the willow tree figure, with the performer slowly packing up the mat after the performance.

Nankin tamasudare is said to have been a popular form of entertainment that began in the Edo period. Today, it is sometimes performed at Japanese cultural festivals.

Chant
There are many variations of lyrics used for the performance, but below is a set that one might hear when observing a performance. The reference to Tokyo Tower, built in 1958, is a modern addition.

See also 
 Sudare

References

External links 
 

Japanese culture
Traditional toys